James E. Dabler (July 26, 1854 – October 5, 1922) was an American politician and businessman.

Dabler was born in Wabash, Indiana. He moved with his parents to a farm, in Princeton, Illinois. Dabler went to the Princeton public schools. He worked for a furniture manufacturing company and then sold hardware and farm machinery in Princeton. Dabler served in the Illinois House of Representatives in 1905 and 1906 and was a Democrat. Dabler died at a hospital in Princeton, Illinois from typhoid fever.

Notes

1854 births
1922 deaths
People from Princeton, Illinois
People from Wabash, Indiana
Businesspeople from Illinois
Democratic Party members of the Illinois House of Representatives
Deaths from typhoid fever